Juan José "Juanjo" Muko Nsue Nzang (born 14 January 1993), sometimes known as just Juanjo, is an Equatoguinean footballer who plays as a forward.

Club career
After graduate from Atlético Madrid, he moved to England. There, he played at Arlesey Town in the Southern League Premier Division after playing for Farnborough and Whyteleafe.

International career
Juanjo was called by the Equatoguinean senior national team for the first time in October 2010 for a friendly match against Botswana. However, he was unable to attend.

Juanjo made his debut on 8 February 2011, when he played a friendly match against Chad.

References

External links

1993 births
Living people
Sportspeople from Malabo
Equatoguinean footballers
Association football forwards
Farnborough F.C. players
Arlesey Town F.C. players
Equatorial Guinea international footballers
Equatoguinean expatriate footballers
Equatoguinean expatriate sportspeople in Spain
Expatriate footballers in Spain
Equatoguinean expatriate sportspeople in England
Expatriate footballers in England